Really & Truly (full names Really Something and Truly Amazing) was a comic strip appearing in the British anthology  2000 AD, created by Grant Morrison and Rian Hughes. It ran in 1993 as part of the "Summer Offensive" and dealt explicitly with drugs. Morrison wrote it in one night after taking Ecstasy.

Characters
Really, one of the main characters
Truly, the other lead
Johnny Zhivago, a cosmonaut
Scuba Trooper, a beat poet
Captain Nice, a government drugs agent who travelled in the House of Fun
Boss Buddah, a gangster

Plot
Really and Truly have to make a cross-country run in a style that mixes Hanna-Barbera with Josie & the Pussycats and On the Road. However, they have a well-defined mission to deliver a consignment of drugs, and encounter big guns, much stranger passengers (Zhivago and Scuba Trooper) and far more determined, and unusual, pursuers (Nice and Buddah) en route.

Publication
In its original run the strip appeared in eight instalments in 2000 AD #842-849, (1993), and was reprinted in Yesterday's Tomorrows: Rian Hughes' Collected Comics (Knockabout Comics, 256 pages, 2007)

"The House of Fun" is a colloquial term for the Central Intelligence Agency (CIA). Morrison reused the name later - it was the title of Volume 1 issue #22 of The Invisibles.

References

External links
2000 AD profile

Comics by Grant Morrison
2000 AD comic strips
2000 AD characters